Raipur is a village in the Pali district of the Indian state of Rajasthan, as well as the Tehsil headquarters. It is situated on the banks of the Luni river, and is locally famous for its Ganesha temple. There is a famous Ramdwara of Ramsnehi Sampradya.

Demographics
The population of Raipur is 14,136 according to the 2001 census, with 7,198 males compared to 6,938 females. Raipur is situated on Ahmedabad-Delhi national highway. Raipur has many historical places which have become a center of attraction for tourists.

References
 Raipur VILLAGE population
 Coordinates

Villages in Pali district